Holme St. Cuthbert School is a primary school which serves the civil parish of Holme St. Cuthbert in the county of Cumbria, United Kingdom. It is located approximately one-and-a-quarter miles north-east of the village of Mawbray, the largest settlement in the parish, and twenty-three miles south-west of the city of Carlisle, Cumbria's county town. As of the 2018-19 academic year, there were sixty-two pupils enrolled in the school. This is just short of the school's capacity of sixty-six pupils. The current headteacher is Mrs Lynn Carini, who took over from Mrs Sheila Daniel in 2014.

History
The school was founded in 1845, the same year as the parish church which is next door. Both are constructed from locally quarried sandstone, though recent additions to the school are built from more modern building materials. In 1995, the school celebrated its 150th anniversary.

The school was rated as "outstanding" by school regulator Ofsted following an inspection in 2007, the highest possible Ofsted rating. An interim report following an inspection in 2010 upheld that rating, resulting in the next full inspection being deferred until 2012. Following the inspection in 2012, the school was judged as "good", the second-highest rating from Ofsted. In order to improve, the 2012 report concluded, the school needed to "improve the quality of teaching and learning to further raise attainment in mathematics by the end of Year 6". A short inspection in 2017 maintained the school's "good" rating, with some improvement noted in mathematics from the previous full inspection, but that further progress was still needed in the teaching and assessment of mathematics.

Headteachers
Mr Duff (c. 1900)
Mr Wilson (1911–1931)
Miss Osborn (c. 1930s)
Mrs Christine France (1988–2005)
Mrs Sheila Daniel (2005–2014)
Mrs Lynn Carini (2014– )

Controversies
The school was involved in a controversy in 2012 when it emerged that a convicted paedophile named Donald Hunt had, in 2011, visited the school while working at a farmers' market, something that would breach the terms of his sexual offences prevention order. Then-headteacher Mrs Daniel spoke at Hunt's four-hour-long trial at Carlisle Magistrates Court, and he was ultimately sentenced to two years of community service.

Pupils
As a primary school, Holme St. Cuthbert caters to pupils aged between four and eleven years of age. There are two classes: infants and juniors. The infant class has pupils from Reception to Year Two, and the junior class from Years Three to Six. In 2007, 47 pupils were enrolled at Holme St. Cuthbert. That number fluctuates from year to year, however. For example, in 2009 there were 46 pupils, one down on the 2007 number, and as of 2015, the number of pupils had risen to 59.

In 2009, Cumbria County Council launched a review into school travelling arrangements, with the aim of encouraging car sharing, walking, and cycling to school, as well as improving awareness of the school's presence to approaching drivers. This was done partly to cut congestion during school opening and closing times, and partly to increase awareness of environmental issues. The school's rural location and the poor condition of roads to and from the school - especially in autumn and winter months - were among the reasons why walking and cycling to school were considered less safe. However, the report aimed to increase the percentages of pupils walking and cycling to school to 5% and 15% respectively, while increasing car-sharing to 15% too.

Catchment Area
Holme St. Cuthbert's main catchment area is the parish of the same name. This includes the village of Mawbray, and many smaller hamlets including Goodyhills, Newtown, and Salta. Some families from outside of the catchment area opt to send their children to Holme St. Cuthbert, due to its good reputation in the local community. In 2009, 13 pupils out of a total enrolment of 46 came from outside of the catchment area.

The school is considered to be a feeder school for Solway Community Technology College in Silloth-on-Solway. However, some pupils prefer to attend the Nelson Thomlinson School in Wigton instead, and as such Holme St. Cuthbert school's car park is one of the stops made by school buses taking pupils to Nelson Thomlinson.

Notable former pupils
 William Wilson, noted academic and Fellow of the Royal Society.

References

External links
Holme St. Cuthbert primary school
Ofsted reports 2001–2012

Primary schools in Cumbria
Community schools in Cumbria
Holme St Cuthbert